The SL 16 (also known as Sirena SL16) is a  4.80 m long fiberglass sailing catamaran. It is designed to be sailed by two people.
The SL 16 was selected by ISAF in 2005 for the Youth Sailing World Championships.

It has a D-PN of 73.0

History
The SL 16 was designed in 2003 by Yves Loday. The boat is based on the KL 15.5 from 1993, but has bigger and more modern rig.

 Units build: 800 total, 200 in 2002-2007, 50 in 2007

See also
 List of multihulls

References

External links
sl16.co SLICA (SL International Class association)
ISAF SL16 Microsite

Classes of World Sailing
Catamarans